BrandCrowd (formerly Brandstack) is an online marketplace for buying and selling logos and domains. Sellers upload logo designs for sale or for critique with fictional brand name concepts, sometimes accompanied by a domain name as a ready-made branding package.

History
Brandstack was founded in March 2008, and had its beginnings under the name Incspring. Founded by CEO Wes Wilson and based out of San Antonio, Texas, Incspring's branding solution caught the attention of the tech blogging community. In June 2009, Incspring changed its name and branding to Brandstack, with a logo acquired within its own service. Brandstack has since been trademarked as Brandstack, LLC.

Brandstack temporarily closed in late 2011, prior to being acquired by DesignCrowd.

On 20 December 2011, DesignCrowd, an online crowdsourcing marketplace, announced the acquisition of Brandstack. Following the acquisition, DesignCrowd changed Brandstack's name and branding, and launched BrandCrowd. In 2018, BrandCrowd launched its own logo maker.  The firm is headquartered in Sydney, Australia.

Products
Brandstack launched a sister site, Upstack.com, in February 2010 for custom design work to augment Branstack.com's marketplace for logos. Included services on Upstack.com are logos, websites, print collateral, illustrations, and basic web graphics. Upstack's custom design service has been replaced by DesignCrowd an Australian-based online crowdsourcing company.

References

External links
Official website
BrandCrowd website
BrandCrowd logo maker

Online marketplaces of Australia